Sir Alan Roy Fersht  (born 21 April 1943) is a British chemist at the MRC Laboratory of Molecular Biology, Cambridge, and an Emeritus Professor in the Department of Chemistry at the University of Cambridge. He was Master of Gonville and Caius College, Cambridge from 2012 to 2018. He works on protein folding, and is sometimes described as a founder of protein engineering.

Early life and education
Fersht was born on 21 April 1943 in Hackney, London. His father, Philip, was a ladies' tailor and his mother, Betty, a dressmaker. His grandparents were Jewish immigrants from Poland, Romania, Lithuania and Belarus. He was educated at Sir George Monoux Grammar School, an all-boys grammar school in Walthamstow, London. He was a keen chess player and was the Essex County Junior champion in 1961. He was awarded a State Scholarship to read Natural Sciences at Gonville and Caius College, Cambridge, where he obtained First Class in Pt I of the Natural Sciences Tripos in 1964, First Class in Pt II (Chemistry) in 1965 and was awarded his PhD degree in 1968. He was President of the University of Cambridge Chess Club in 1964-65 and awarded a half blue in 1965.

Career and research
Fersht spent a post-doctoral year (1968–1969) at Brandeis University working under William Jencks. He returned to Cambridge in 1969 as a group leader at the Laboratory of Molecular Biology until 1977 and a junior research fellow at Jesus College, Cambridge until 1972. Fersht was Wolfson Research Professor of the Royal Society and Professor of Biological Chemistry at Imperial College London from 1978 to 1988. He spent a sabbatical year at Stanford University on an Eleanor Roosevelt Fellowship of the American Cancer Society with Arthur Kornberg (1978–79). Fersht was Herchel Smith Professor of Organic Chemistry at Cambridge from 1988 to 2010. He was the Director of the Cambridge Centre for Protein Engineering from 1990 to 2010 when, on reaching the retirement age, he became an Emeritus Group Leader at the Laboratory of Molecular Biology. He is a Fellow of both Gonville & Caius College and Imperial College.

Alan Fersht is widely regarded as one of the main pioneers of protein engineering, which he developed as a primary method for analysis of the structure, activity and folding of proteins. He has developed methods for the resolution of protein folding in the sub-millisecond time-scale and has pioneered the method of phi value analysis for studying the folding transition states of proteins. His interests also include protein misfolding, disease and cancer.

Selected publications 
 Structure and Mechanism in Protein Science: A Guide to Enzyme Catalysis and Protein Folding
 The Selected Papers of Sir Alan Fersht: Development of Protein Engineering

Awards and honours

Fersht was elected a Fellow of the Royal Society (FRS) in 1983. The Royal Society awarded him the Gabor Medal in 1991 for molecular biology, in 1998 the Davy Medal for chemistry and in 2008 the Royal Medal. He is a Foreign Associate of the United States National Academy of Sciences, a Foreign Member of the American Philosophical Society, a Foreign Member of the Accademia dei Lincei, Member of Academia Europaea, an Honorary Foreign Member of the American Academy of Arts and Sciences and a Fellow of the Academy of Medical Sciences (FMedSci). His nomination for the Royal Society reads: 

Fersht holds honorary doctorates from Uppsala University (1999), Vrije Universiteit Brussel (1999), Weizmann Institute of Science (2004), Hebrew University of Jerusalem (2006), and Aarhus University (2008). He is an Honorary Fellow of Darwin College, Cambridge (2014) and Jesus College, Cambridge (2017). 

Fersht has received many prizes and medals including: the FEBS Anniversary Prize; Novo Biotechnology Award; Charmian Medal of the Royal Society of Chemistry; Max Tishler Lecture and Prize Harvard University; The Datta Lectureship and Medal of the Federation of European Biochemical Societies; Jubilee Lecture and the Harden Medal of the Biochemical Society; Feldberg Foundation Prize, Distinguished Service Award, Miami Nature Biotechnology Winter Symposium; Christian B. Anfinsen Award of the Protein Society; Natural Products Award of the Royal Society of Chemistry, Stein and Moore Award of the Protein Society; Bader Award of the American Chemical Society; Kaj Ulrik Linderstrøm-Lang Prize and Medal; Bijvoet Medal of the Bijvoet Center for Biomolecular Research of Utrecht University in 2008 and the Gilbert N. Lewis Medal University of California, Berkeley, and the Wilhelm Exner Medal in 2009.

In 2003 he was knighted for his pioneering work on protein science. His citation on election to the Academy of Medical Sciences reads: 

In August 2020 he was awarded the Copley Medal of The Royal Society, for his development and application of methods of protein engineering to provide descriptions of protein folding pathways at atomic resolution.

Personal life
Fersht's recreations include chess, horology and wildlife photography.  He married Marilyn Persell in 1966 and has one son and one daughter.

References

External links

1943 births
Living people
British chemists
British Jews
Jewish scientists
Alumni of Gonville and Caius College, Cambridge
Fellows of Gonville and Caius College, Cambridge
Members of the University of Cambridge Department of Chemistry
Academics of Imperial College London
Fellows of the Royal Society
Knights Bachelor
Foreign associates of the National Academy of Sciences
Members of the European Molecular Biology Organization
Fellows of the Academy of Medical Sciences (United Kingdom)
Royal Medal winners
English biophysicists
Masters of Gonville and Caius College, Cambridge

People educated at Sir George Monoux College
People from Walthamstow
Jewish chemists
Bijvoet Medal recipients
Recipients of the Copley Medal